Morlet is a commune in the Saône-et-Loire department in the region of Bourgogne-Franche-Comté in France.

Demographics
At the census of 1999, the population was 74.

See also
Communes of the Saône-et-Loire department

References

Communes of Saône-et-Loire